2017 Urawa Red Diamonds season.

J1 League

Emperor's Cup

YBC Levain Cup

FUJI XEROX Supercup

AFC Champions League

FIFA Club World Cup

International Matches

References

External links
 J.League official site

Urawa Red Diamonds
Urawa Red Diamonds seasons
Urawa